Krafft may refer to:
 Krafft (crater), a crater on the Moon
 Krafft temperature, the minimum temperature at which surfactants form micelles
 Krafft Arnold Ehricke (1917–1984), rocket-propulsion engineer and advocate for space colonization
 Krafft (surname), a surname

See also 
 Kraft (disambiguation)
 Craft (disambiguation)